Anthony Fane may refer to:

Anthony Fane, 13th Earl of Westmorland (1859–1922)
Anthony Fane, 16th Earl of Westmorland (b. 1951)